Spiranthes lacera, commonly called the slender ladies'-tresses, is a species of orchid that is native to Eastern North America. It has a widespread range and is found in a variety of open habitats, both natural and disturbed. It produces a spiral of white flowers in the summer.

There are two varieties recognized:
S. lacera var. gracilis - Southern slender ladies' tresses, flowers more densely arranged in spiral, blooming later (late-July through August). Plant hairless and leaves usually absent at flowering.
S. lacera var. lacera - Northern slender ladies' tresses,  flowers more loosely arranged in spiral, blooming earlier (mid-July). Plant hairy and leaves usually present at flowering.

References

lacera
Orchids of North America
Orchids of the United States
Plants described in 1818
Taxa named by Constantine Samuel Rafinesque